Daryl Runswick (born 12 October 1946) is a classically trained English composer, arranger, jazz musician, producer and educationalist.

Career
Runswick was born in Leicester, and educated at Wyggeston Grammar School for Boys and Corpus Christi College, Cambridge. He started playing bass with leading UK jazz musicians in the mid-1960s, including Dick Morrissey and John Dankworth, with whom he would tour and compose for extensively for some 12 years. In 1969, he was a member of the Lionel Grigson-Pete Burden Quintet, and in 1972 he played and recorded with the Ian Hamer Septet, a band in which he coincided with Tubby Hayes, among others, and throughout the 1970s he was also a member of the London Jazz Four. As a session musician he later branched out into more popular music, including appearing on the first The Alan Parsons Project recording and working with Elton John.

He has also worked with the London Sinfonietta, Nash Ensemble and The King's Singers, Pierre Boulez, Ornette Coleman, Simon Rattle and Sarah Vaughan.

Cleo Laine has recorded several of his compositions.

From 1983 to 1998 he was the tenor singer and resident composer in the avant-garde electronic vocal group Electric Phoenix, performing worldwide and working with, among others, composers Luciano Berio, Pierre Boulez, John Cage and Henri Pousseur.

From 1995 to 2005 he was Head of Composition Faculty at Trinity College of Music (notable students include Angie Atmadjaja, Dai Fujikura, Harris Kittos, Nikos Veliotis and Reynaldo Young).

As a composer he has written film and TV scores, including the films Gullsandur (Golden Sands) (1985) and No Surrender (1985), and the TV series Brond (1987) with Bill Nelson, The Advocates (1991–92) and Seekers (1993). His major concert work, Maybe I Can Have an Everlasting Love for voice, computer-generated electronics and orchestra, premiered in 2005 at Blackheath Halls, London. His works have also been conducted by Jeffrey Skidmore and played by the BBC Symphony Orchestra, among others.

As a record producer, Runswick has also produced recordings by Keith Tippett.

Runswick is the author of a standard textbook Rock, Jazz and Pop Arranging.

Discography
 The Johnstons (1968)
Atlantic Bridge (1970)
That's Just the Way I Want to Be (1970) []
Rites and Rituals (1970) []
Rock Workshop (1971) []
The Very Last Time (1971) []
From the Beggar's Mantle (1971) []
Live at the ICA (1972) []
Acropolis (1972) [] (released 2005) 
Secret Asylum (1973) []
Tales of Mystery and Imagination (1976) []
Alan Branscombe & Tony Coe (1977)
In Hoagland – Georgie Fame (1981) []
 "Secret Ceremony (Theme From Brond)" / "Wiping A Tear From The All Seeing Eye" 7" & 12" single versions (1987) [Scala Featuring  &  Cocteau
 My Family and Other Animals (1987)

References

External links
 
 

1946 births
Living people
Alumni of Corpus Christi College, Cambridge
British jazz double-bassists
English jazz composers
English male composers
20th-century classical composers
21st-century classical composers
English male classical composers
English classical composers
Male double-bassists
Male jazz composers
People educated at Wyggeston Grammar School for Boys
20th-century English composers
21st-century double-bassists
20th-century British male musicians
21st-century British male musicians
20th-century jazz composers
21st-century jazz composers